TFCU may refer to:

 Teachers Federal Credit Union
 Tinker Federal Credit Union, a credit union in Oklahoma
 Tower Federal Credit Union, a credit union in Maryland
 Transportation Federal Credit Union
 Tropical Financial Credit Union, a credit union in Florida
 Truliant Federal Credit Union, a credit union in North Carolina
 Tucson Federal Credit Union
 Tyco Federal Credit Union, a credit union serving Tyco, Tyco Electronics and Covidien